Samara Weaving (born 23 February 1992) is an Australian actress and model. She began her career in her home country, playing Kirsten Mulroney on the drama series Out of the Blue (2008). She came to prominence with her portrayal of Indi Walker on the soap opera Home and Away (2009–2013), for which she received an Australian Academy of Cinema and Television Arts (AACTA) nomination for Best Female Performance.

Following her departure from Home and Away, Weaving pursued roles in the United States, starring in the first season of the series Ash vs Evil Dead (2015–2016) and becoming a series regular on SMILF (2017–2019). She starred in the films Mayhem (2017), The Babysitter (2017), and Three Billboards Outside Ebbing, Missouri (2017), with the latter winning the cast a Screen Actors Guild Award. She earned acclaim for headlining the critically and commercially successful feature Ready or Not (2019)—her first lead role in a theatrical American film—and was established as a scream queen.

Weaving has alternated frequently between film and television, starring in the miniseries Picnic at Hanging Rock (2018), Hollywood (2020), and Nine Perfect Strangers (2021), and having roles in the films Guns Akimbo (2019), Last Moment of Clarity (2020), The Babysitter: Killer Queen (2020), Bill & Ted Face the Music (2020), and Scream VI (2023).

Early life
Weaving was born in Adelaide on 23 February 1992, the daughter of an English father, Simon Weaving, and Maltese mother, Helena Bezzina. She grew up in Singapore, Fiji, Australia, and Indonesia. Her father is a filmmaker and lecturer at the University of Newcastle in Newcastle, New South Wales, as well as the artistic director of the Canberra International Film Festival. Her mother is an art therapist who teaches museum studies at the University of Newcastle. Her younger sister, Morgan, is also an actress; their uncle is actor Hugo Weaving.

Weaving and her family moved to Canberra in 2005, and she attended Canberra Girls Grammar School. She became drama captain and appeared in various school and theatre productions.

Career
Weaving's first major acting role was Kirsten Mulroney in the 2008 Australian-UK soap opera Out of the Blue. It was not commissioned for a second season. In 2009, Weaving was cast as Indigo "Indi" Walker in the Australian soap opera Home and Away. She initially appeared for five weeks in a recurring capacity. Weaving reprised the role the following year after producers brought her and her on-screen family back as part of the main cast. She relocated from Canberra to Sydney for filming. For her portrayal of Indi, Weaving received a nomination for the Audience Choice Award for Best Female Performance in a Television Drama at the 1st AACTA Awards in 2012. In July 2013, Weaving confirmed that she had filmed her last scenes for Home and Away. She felt that with the show's international success, it was the right time to pursue new roles. That same year, she appeared in the crime film Mystery Road, alongside her uncle Hugo Weaving. Weaving had a recurring role as Heather in the first season of Ash vs Evil Dead in 2015. That same year, Weaving also appeared in the comedy web series Squirrel Boys.

Weaving began modelling for Australian underwear brand Bonds in 2012. In 2016, she appeared in the action comedy Monster Trucks as Brianne. She was cast in the role during her first trip to Los Angeles in 2014. The following year, she starred in the action comedy-thriller Mayhem, and as the title character in the comedy-horror film The Babysitter, which was released in October. She also had a role in the film Three Billboards Outside Ebbing, Missouri as John Hawkes' girlfriend and appeared in the music video for Charlie Puth's song "Attention".

From 2017 to 2019, she played Nelson Rose in the Showtime series SMILF. In December 2018, it was announced that Weaving was leaving the show after the second season. Weaving asked to be released from her contract after making a complaint about having to perform a nude sex scene. Daniel Holloway of Variety reported that Weaving felt uncomfortable with the behaviour of show creator and co-star Frankie Shaw during a similar sex scene in the first season, leading to an investigation of alleged misconduct by Shaw, which found that there was no wrongdoing on Shaw's part.

In 2018, Weaving appeared in the Picnic at Hanging Rock miniseries as one of three students who disappear during a school trip to the titular Hanging Rock. She starred in the comedy-horror film Ready or Not (2019). The film and her performance received positive reviews, and helped to establish her as a scream queen. She then starred in the action comedy Guns Akimbo (2019), and, in 2020, headlined the drama thriller Last Moment of Clarity, reprised her role in The Babysitter: Killer Queen, and played Thea Preston, the daughter of Alex Winter's character, in Bill & Ted Face the Music. She also portrayed Scarlett in the G.I. Joe spinoff Snake Eyes (2021). Weaving is part of the cast of the Hulu drama series Nine Perfect Strangers, which is based on the novel of the same name by Liane Moriarty. Weaving portrays Jessica, one of the strangers who attends a health and wellness resort, alongside Nicole Kidman, Melissa McCarthy and Asher Keddie. Weaving stars alongside Eugenio Derbez in the 2022 romantic comedy The Valet, which is a remake of the 2006 French film of the same name.

Weaving will play American socialite Elizabeth Patterson Bonaparte in Adam Leon's biopic Liz, and former Playboy Bunny Holly Madison in a limited television series based on Madison's memoir Down the Rabbit Hole: Curious Adventures and Cautionary Tales of a Former Playboy Bunny. She has also been cast in Damien Chazelle's period drama film Babylon. Weaving joined the cast of biographical film Chevalier as the female lead Marie-Josephine in July 2021. In October 2021, Weaving was cast as assassin June 27 in Boy Kills World, alongside Bill Skarsgård and Yayan Ruhian. She exited the project in early 2022 due to scheduling conflicts and was replaced by Jessica Rothe. In July 2022, Weaving joined the cast of Scream VI, to be released in 2023. She was also cast in Jimmy Warden's comedy-thriller Borderline, alongside Eric Dane and Ray Nicholson.

Personal life
Weaving has been in a relationship with writer Jimmy Warden since meeting him on the set of The Babysitter. They announced their engagement on 10 March 2019, and married that same year.

Filmography

Film

Television

Music videos

Awards and nominations

References

External links

 
  Canberra Girls' Grammar newsletter announcing Samara's role
  Samara Weaving on TVSA

1992 births
Living people
21st-century Australian actresses
Actresses from Adelaide
Actresses from Jakarta
Australian child actresses
Australian film actresses
Australian television actresses
Australian people of English descent
Australian people of Maltese descent
Outstanding Performance by a Cast in a Motion Picture Screen Actors Guild Award winners